The terms Baltic Sea Region, Baltic Rim countries (or simply the Baltic Rim), and the Baltic Sea countries/states refer to slightly different combinations of countries in the general area surrounding the Baltic Sea, mainly in Northern Europe. The term "Baltic states" refers specifically to one such grouping.

Etymology 

The first to name it the Baltic Sea was 11th century German chronicler Adam of Bremen.

Denotation 
Depending on the context the Baltic Sea Region might stand for:

 The countries that have shorelines along the Baltic Sea: Denmark, Estonia, Finland, Germany, Latvia, Lithuania, Poland, Russia, and Sweden.
 The group of countries that are members of the inter-governmental Baltic Assembly and Baltic Council of Ministers, and generally referred to by the shorthand, Baltic states:  Estonia, Latvia, and Lithuania.
 Estonia, Latvia, Lithuania and Kaliningrad Oblast of Russia, exclaved from the remainder of Russia.
 Historic East Prussia and the historical lands of Livonia, Courland and Estonia (Swedish Estonia and Russian Estonia).
 The former Baltic governorates of Imperial Russia: Today's Estonia and Latvia (excluding parts of modern Eastern Latvia that were part of Vitebsk Governorate).
 The countries on the historical British trade route through the Baltic Sea, i.e. including the Scandinavian Peninsula (Sweden and Norway).
 Members of the Council of the Baltic Sea States (CBSS), are the countries with shorelines along the Baltic Sea, in addition to Norway, Iceland and the European Commission.
 The islands of the Euroregion B7 Baltic Islands Network, which includes the islands and archipelagos Åland (autonomous region of Finland), Bornholm (Denmark), Gotland (Sweden), Hiiumaa (Estonia), Öland (Sweden), Rügen (Germany), and Saaremaa (Estonia).
 On historic Scandinavian and German maps, the Balticum sometimes includes only the historically or culturally German-dominated lands, or provinces, of Estonia, Livonia, Courland and Latgale (corresponding to modern Estonia and Latvia),  East Prussia, Samogitia (corresponding to modern Western Lithuania) as well as sometimes Pomerania, Kashubia, while the historically less-Germanized Eastern Lithuania is occasionally excluded.
In geology, the Baltic Shield includes Fennoscandia, parts of northwestern Russia and the northern Baltic Sea.

See also 
 Baltia (Roman mythology)
 Baltic states
 Baltoscandia
 Council of the Baltic Sea States
 List of Intangible Cultural Heritage elements in Northern Europe
 Nordic Estonia
 Northern Dimension
 North Sea Region

Notes

References

Further reading 
 Norbert Götz. "Spatial Politics and Fuzzy Regionalism: The Case of the Baltic Sea Area." Baltic Worlds 9 (2016) 3: 54–67.

External links 

 Council of the Baltic Sea States official website
 The Baltic Sea Information Centre
 EU Baltic Sea Region Strategy (EUSBSR) - a strategy aiming to accelerate the integration of the region 
 The Baltic University Programme - a university network focused on a sustainable development in the Baltic Sea region.
 Baltic Sea Region Spatial Planning Initiative VASAB
 Baltic Sea Region Programme 2007-2013
 Vifanord – a digital library that provides scientific information on the Nordic and Baltic countries as well as the Baltic region as a whole.

 
Region
Geography of Central Europe
Geography of Eastern Europe
Geography of Northern Europe
Regions of Europe